Elizabeth Rosalind "Betsy" Wollheim (born 5 December 1951, New York) is the President, co-Publisher and co-Editor-in-Chief of science fiction and fantasy publisher DAW Books, "a small private company, owned exclusively by its publishers." The latter roles are shared with Sheila E. Gilbert. She had worked at DAW as an associate editor from 1975.

Her father, Donald A. Wollheim, with her mother Elsie B. Wollheim, established DAW Books in 1971. She took over leadership of DAW in 1985.

Recognition
 2018 World Fantasy Award for Lifetime Achievement
 2012 Hugo Award for Best Professional Editor (Long Form)
 1992 shared Chesley Awards for best art director with Sheila E. Gilbert 
 1990 shared Chesley Awards for best art director with Sheila E. Gilbert

References

American book editors
American women editors
1951 births
Science fiction editors
People from New York (state)
Living people
Forest Hills High School (New York) alumni
Clark University alumni
Women speculative fiction editors
21st-century American women